Daryl Frank Dragon (August 27, 1942 – January 2, 2019) was an American musician, known as Captain from the pop musical duo Captain & Tennille with his then-wife, Toni Tennille.

Career

Born into a musical family, Dragon was the son of Eloise (Rawitzer) and conductor, composer, and arranger Carmen Dragon, and the elder brother of Dennis Dragon, a member of the 1960s pop combo The Dragons and the 1980s surf band the Surf Punks.  His godfather was actor and comedian Danny Thomas.

Dragon suffered from megalocornea, a condition which results in large eyeballs.  It forced him to wear ever-present sunglasses. 

Dragon's familiar image and stage name came from his time as a keyboard player with The Beach Boys from 1967 to 1972. Beach Boys lead singer Mike Love gave him the nickname "Captain Keyboard", and it stuck; Dragon began wearing a nautical captain's hat to go along with the name. As Captain in Captain & Tennille, Dragon was frequently silent and a man of very few words, playing a foil to his outgoing, vivacious wife, Toni Tennille.

Music work outside Captain & Tennille
In 1962, Dragon became a member of the band Charles Wright and the Wright Sounds, which included the future Watts Band member John Raynford.  He also played with The Yellow Balloon in 1967.

Dragon studied piano at San Fernando Valley State College from 19631966, dropping out to form a band with his brothers. In 1968, Dragon and his brother Dennis formed a studio band called The Mission, which produced a one-off single on the small Bet Records label: "Calmilly"/"Galing Made It". The songs later appeared on a joint album in 1971 titled Me and My Brother (aided by another brother, Doug, who sang the vocals), which was released on CD in 2005.

In the late 1960s, Daryl and his brothers Doug and Dennis recorded sessions for a psychedelic soul/rock album as "The Dragons", but they were unable to get a record label to release the album. The album was titled BFI, which stood for "Blue Forces Intelligence". In 2007, UK label Ninja Tune discovered that the recording engineer, Donn Landee, still had the master tapes and they released the album.

On the double LP The Visit by Bob Smith, released in 1970, Dragon is credited as Captain Keyboard.

Dragon also made significant contributions with keyboarding and musical scoring on the Beach Boys' 1972 release Carl and the Passions – "So Tough"; he co-wrote the track "Cuddle Up" with Dennis Wilson. Also, Dragon's orchestrations on the tracks "Make It Good" and "Cuddle Up" translated the melodic ideas that Wilson was seeking. Additionally, Dragon arranged the coda on "Don't Go Near The Water" from the Beach Boys' 1971 release Surf's Up. A plaque featuring Dragon's name was unveiled by Roger Williams University and music historians Al Gomes and Connie Watrous of Big Noise at the Baypoint Inn & Conference Center in Portsmouth, Rhode Island, on September 21, 2017, honoring the Beach Boys for a significant historic event in their career - the band's concert on September 22, 1971, at The Ramada Inn in Portsmouth. The concert was the first-ever appearance of South African musicians Ricky Fataar and Blondie Chaplin in the band, essentially changing the Beach Boys' live act into a multi-cultural group. Dragon served as musical director for the 1971 concert. 
 
Dragon contributed vibes and melodica in the song "Wind 'n' Sea" by the band Farm, a group assembled by Dennis and Doug for the soundtrack to The Innermost Limits of Pure Fun, a surf film directed by George Greenough. He also did session work with Dennis for the Go for It soundtrack and, in the early 1980s, with the rock band Survivor. In 1981, Dragon contributed to Carpenters' Made In America album, programming synthesizers on "(Want You) Back In My Life Again".

Personal life

Neurological condition
In late 2009, Toni Tennille announced her husband had developed familial tremor.  According to Tennille, his condition was neither debilitating nor terminal. Rather, his noticeable tremor was exacerbated by stress and anxiety. Subsequently, the tremor condition limited most of Dragon's public appearances. In November 2009, Toni Tennille announced that Dragon was under a physician's care to determine the best method of his treatment.

In September 2010, Tennille publicly clarified her husband's condition as "a neurological condition (later confirmed to be essential tremor), which causes him to have tremors". Tennille indicated the condition was debilitating to Dragon's abilities as a musician.

Divorce
Tennille filed for divorce from Dragon in Arizona on January 16, 2014, after 39 years of marriage. Dragon stated he was unaware of this until he was served with the divorce papers. Dragon, contacted by TMZ on January 22, 2014, stated: "I don't know why Toni filed for divorce."

On January 23, 2014, The Washington Post reported health insurance related to health issues might be the reason for the divorce, as both issues had been referenced in divorce documents filed with the courts. Tennille had reported on her blog in 2010 her husband's neurological condition was characterized by such extreme tremors he could no longer play keyboards.

The divorce was finalized in July 2014. In her memoirs, Tennille described their marriage as loveless and lacking physical affection.

Regarding his ex-wife's new memoirs, Dragon stated, "No, I haven't read it." In an interview on March 17, 2016, Dragon, responding to the book by his ex-wife, would comment only, "I was drugged [at the time of my divorce] — that's all I can tell you."

On April 12, 2016, while appearing on the Today show, Tennille confirmed her divorce from Dragon was finalized and stated the reason for the divorce was Dragon's "inability to be affectionate". Tennille later said that Dragon had reacted positively to the Today segment and told her: "I saw you on The Today Show. I was proud of you."

In an interview published in a February 2017 issue of People, Dragon stated he was making great progress and feeling like himself again, after corrections were made in the dosage of medications he was taking, which had been causing side effects. Dragon stated his ex-wife had flown to Arizona and had been a help in his improvement.

Death
Dragon died on January 2, 2019, from kidney failure in Prescott, Arizona, aged 76, with Tennille by his side.

References

External links

 

1942 births
2019 deaths
20th-century American pianists
20th-century American male musicians
21st-century American keyboardists
21st-century American pianists
21st-century American male musicians
A&M Records artists
American male pianists
American people of Italian descent
American rock keyboardists
American rock pianists
Casablanca Records artists
Deaths from kidney failure
Grammy Award winners
Musicians from Los Angeles
Songwriters from California
The Beach Boys backing band members
20th-century American keyboardists